Hun Manet  (born 20 October 1977) is a Cambodian lieutenant general who currently serves in the Royal Cambodian Armed Forces (RCAF) as the commander of Royal Cambodian Army since 2018. He is the eldest son of Cambodian prime minister Hun Sen and Bun Rany. He also leads his father's personal bodyguard unit and the nation's counterterrorism taskforce. Although he does not currently hold any political offices, Manet is a member of the Cambodian People's Party Standing Committee, the party's decision-making body, and is the head of its youth wing.

Manet grew up and received his general education in Phnom Penh and later joined the armed forces in 1995, the same year he entered the United States Military Academy at West Point. Having received his diploma in 1999, Manet became the first Cambodian ever to graduate from the prestigious academy.

He has been mentioned by both media outlets and Hun Sen himself as a candidate for prime minister. On 24 December 2021, Manet was unanimously elected by the Cambodian People's Party Central Committee to be the party's future candidate for prime minister after Hun Sen, essentially making him the prime minister-in-waiting.

Biography

Manet was born on 20 October 1977 in Koh Thmar Village, Memot District, Kampong Cham Province during the Khmer Rouge rule of Cambodia as the second son of Hun Sen and Bun Rany. On the night of his birth, a bright light flew over the roof of the house, of which Hun Sen believed his son was born from a supernatural being that is worshipped in Koh Thmar Village.

Manet grew up and received his General Education in Phnom Penh and later joined the Royal Cambodian Armed Forces in 1995, the same year he entered the United States Military Academy at West Point. Having received his diploma in May 1999, he became the first Cambodian graduate of the academy, and one of only seven foreign cadets to graduate that year. Upon graduation from West Point, he received his bachelor's degree in economics and a commission as Lieutenant in the Royal Cambodian Army. He also received his Master of Arts in economics from New York University, US, in 2002, and a PhD in Economics from University of Bristol, United Kingdom, in 2008.

Manet received appointment as the Commander of Cambodia's National Counter-Terrorism Special Forces with the rank of Colonel in 2008, with the responsibility to help build Cambodia's capability to fight against terrorism. He earned the rank of Lieutenant General in June 2013, shortly after being named Deputy Commander of the Royal Cambodian Army and Deputy Chief of Joint Staff of the RCAF. During the 2008-2011 Cambodia-Thai confrontation, Hun Manet played a prominent role in negotiations to end the stand-off. He is also very involved with reforming process of the RCAF, especially focusing on young military officers and soldiers. Apart from professional military duties, he is actively involved with many social programs. He is the Chief of the Samdech Techo Hun Sen Scholarship Committee and the Samdech Techo Scholarship Association, which provides scholarship opportunities to thousands of Cambodian youths to study at universities across Cambodia. He is also the chairman of the Board of Directors of the Samdech Techo Youth Volunteer Doctor Association (TYDA), which mobilizes thousands of medical professionals, medical students and volunteers to help provide free healthcare to rural Cambodians throughout the country. He is also engaged with a number of other activities to promote humanitarian activities for orphanages and handicaps. Manet is married to Pich Chanmony.

On 30 June 2018, weeks before the parliamentary elections, Hun Sen appointed his second eldest son, Hun Manet, into higher military positions in a bid to prepare his son for the premiership when he retires in politics or dies, effectively solidifying the Hun political dynasty in Cambodia. He has been mentioned by Hun Sen as his potential successor.

In June 2020, Manet was promoted to head of the CPP's youth wing.

Hun Sen publicly announced his endorsement of Manet's candidacy as prime minister for the first time in December 2021. Although having never publicly expressed interest in the role, he received strong support from several government ministers, party members as well as the CPP's influential Standing Committee. Hun Sen stressed however that a succession will not take place until at least after the 2028 election.

Military service
Hun Manet joined the army in 1995, the same year he entered the United States Military Academy. He became Major General in January 2011, just months after being named Deputy Commander of the Royal Cambodian Army and Deputy Chief of the RCAF Joint Staff.  Manet played a prominent role in negotiations during the 2008 Cambodian-Thai stand-off. He became a lieutenant general in June 2013, and was later promoted to a four star general in July 2018 coinciding with his taking over responsibilities as the deputy commander-in-chief of the Royal Cambodian Armed Forces (RFAC). His younger brother, Hun Manith, also serves in the army, as brigadier general.

Personal life
Hun Manet is married to Pich Chanmony, the daughter of Pich Sophoan, a former secretary of state at the Ministry of Labour. One of his children is a U.S. citizen, born while Manet was studying there.

References

1977 births
Living people
Cambodian Buddhists
20th-century military personnel
21st-century economists
21st-century military personnel
Alumni of the University of Bristol
Cambodian expatriates in the United States
Cambodian generals
Cambodian military personnel
Cambodian people of Chinese descent
Cambodian People's Party politicians
Children of prime ministers of Cambodia
Children of national leaders
Knights Grand Cross of the Royal Order of Cambodia
New York University alumni
People from Kampong Cham province
People from Tboung Khmum province
United States Military Academy alumni
Hun Sen
Hun family